Candace Hutson (born May 3, 1980) is an American actress. She played Cera in The Land Before Time (1988) and its first three sequels, Jessie Wade in Dolly Dearest (1991) and Molly Newton in Evening Shade (1991–1994).

Filmography

Film

Television

References

1980 births
Living people
American child actresses
American television actresses
20th-century American actresses
21st-century American women